Guangqi Honda Automobile Co., Ltd., also called GAC-Honda, is a Chinese automobile manufacturing joint venture company based in Guangzhou, Guangdong province.

Co-owned by Honda and GAC Group (Guangqi), Guangqi Honda operates two plants that, produces Honda-branded models and one car sold under the China-only Everus brand. Its products comprise the Everus S1, Honda Accord, Honda Crider, Honda City, Honda Crosstour, Honda Vezel, Honda Fit, and Honda Odyssey. Guangqi Honda's products incorporate Japanese-made parts.

Originally named Guangzhou Honda, this was changed to Guangqi Honda in 2009. , the company boasts a per year production capacity of 480,000.

History
Seeking to replace the loss-making of the Guangzhou Peugeot Automobile Company for a joint venture with another foreign car-maker, the government of Guangzhou established Guangzhou Honda Automobile Co Ltd with Honda, which beat out a number of rivals for the privilege, in May or July of 1998. Guangqi Honda launched its first model, an American version Accord in March 1999 along with its first 4S shop.

Making a product that the Chinese consumer had familiarity with through high quality imports as well as a pre-existing sales and service network for these cars may have contributed to the early success of Guangqi Honda. A recently failed joint venture between the Guangzhou Government and Peugeot (Guangzhou Peugeot Automobile Company) also helped to prepare the ground.

Beginning in 2009, Guangqi Honda has distributed automobiles by ship—reducing secondary transport distances and transport losses while also being environmentally responsible. The company also uses rail and road transport.

Everus

Everus (Li Nian ), Guangqi Honda's first China-only brand, is targeted at consumers in inland cities like Chaozhou and Lanzhou who can't afford its Honda-branded vehicles but desire the cachet and technological underpinnings foreign-tied brands offer. While it was the first China-only brand for any sino-foreign joint venture  other, similar marques do exist such as the Dongfeng/Nissan Venucia.

The first Everus model, the S1 subcompact, was unveiled at the 2010 Guangzhou Auto Show. The S1 is based on an old model of the Honda City.

Customer service award
Guangqi Honda ranked highest in customer satisfaction with authorized dealer after-sales service according to the J.D. Power Asia Pacific 2009 China Customer Service Index Study.

Products

Acura
 CDX
 RDX
 TLX-L

Everus
 VE-1
 EA6

Honda
 Accord
 Avancier
 Breeze
 City
 Crider
 Fit
 Integra
 Odyssey
 Vezel
 ZR-V
 e:NP1

Former products
 Everus S1 (2010-2013)
 Honda Crosstour (2010-2015)

Gallery

See also

List of Honda assembly plants
Dongfeng Honda

References

External links
 

Car manufacturers of China
GAC Group joint ventures
Honda factories
Motor vehicle assembly plants in China
Vehicle manufacturing companies established in 1998
Chinese companies established in 1998
Chinese-foreign joint-venture companies
Manufacturing companies based in Guangzhou
Honda